Turbonilla halibrecta is a species of sea snail, a marine gastropod mollusk in the family Pyramidellidae, the pyrams and their allies.

Description
The shell has an elongate-conic shape. Its length measures 6.2 mm. The two helicoid whorls of the protoconch are depressed. Their axis is at nearly right angles to that of the succeeding turns, in the first of which they are very slightly immersed. The nine whorls off the teleoconch are flattened in the middle, and slightly rounded toward the somewhat shouldered summit and the periphery. They are marked by strong, rounded, almost vertical axial ribs, of which there are 20 on the first to fifth, 18 upon the sixth, and 16 upon the remaining turns. The intercostal spaces are a little wider than the ribs, and well impressed. The sutures are strongly marked. The periphery of the body whorl is well rounded. It is marked by the
feeble continuations of the axial ribs. The base of the shell is short, and well rounded. The entire surface of the spire and the base is marked by exceedingly fine, closely crowded, spiral striations. The oval aperture is rather small. The posterior angle is acute. The columella is short and curved.

Distribution
The type specimen was found in the Pacific Ocean off Catalina Island, California.

References

External links
 To World Register of Marine Species
 To ITIS

halibrecta
Gastropods described in 1909